Leonard Smelt (7 December 1883 – 8 February 1933) was an English professional association footballer who played as a full back.

Smelt's final game for Burnley, the 'Clarets' was on 18 April 1925 at the age of 41 years and 132 days.

References 

 

1883 births
1933 deaths
Footballers from Rotherham
English footballers
Association football fullbacks
Gainsborough Trinity F.C. players
Sutton Junction F.C. players
Rotherham Town F.C. (1899) players
Chesterfield F.C. players
Burnley F.C. wartime guest players
Burnley F.C. players
Barrow A.F.C. players
Frickley Athletic F.C. players
Ashton United F.C. players
English Football League players